The 2019 Atlantic Coast Conference men's soccer season was the 66th season of men's varsity soccer in the conference.

The Wake Forest Demon Deacons are the defending champions of the Atlantic Conference and the North Carolina are the defending champions of the Coastal Conference.  Wake Forest are the defending ACC tournament champions.

Changes from 2018 

After the 2018 season, Louisville Cardinals coach Ken Lolla resigned after 13 years and a 155–77–39 record with the team. He was replaced by John Michael Hayden on December 27, 2018

Teams

Stadiums and locations 

1.  Florida State, Georgia Tech and Miami do not sponsor men's soccer

Personnel 

Notes
Records shown are prior to the 2019 season
Years at school includes the 2019 season
ACC records include only years with current school.

Preseason

Hermann Trophy

Prior to the season five ACC men's soccer players were selected to the MAC Hermann Trophy watch list.

Preseason poll
The 2019 ACC preseason poll was announced on August 19, 2019.  The league's 12 head coaches voted North Carolina as the preseason favorite, with 9 of the 12 votes.  Full results of the preseason poll are shown below:

Preseason national polls 

Preseason polls will come out in August 2019. CollegeSoccerNews.com and Hero Sports use a Top 30 ranking throughout the season, while United Soccer, Soccer America, and Top Drawer Soccer use a Top 25 ranking throughout the season.

Regular season 

All times Eastern time.

Week 1 (Aug. 26 – Sept. 1)

Players of the week:

Week 2 (Sept. 2 – Sept. 8)

Players of the week:

Week 3 (Sept. 9 – Sept. 15)

Players of the week:

Week 4 (Sept. 16 – Sept. 22)

Players of the week:

Week 5 (Sept. 23 – Sept. 29)

Players of the week:

Week 6 (Sept. 30 – Oct. 6)

Players of the week:

Week 7 (Oct. 7 – Oct. 13)

Players of the week:

Week 8 (Oct. 14 – Oct. 20)

Players of the week:

Week 9 (Oct. 21 – Oct. 27)

Players of the week:

Week 9 (Oct. 28 – Nov. 3)

Players of the week:

Rankings

National

United Soccer

Top Drawer Soccer

Regional – USC South Region

Postseason

ACC tournament

NCAA tournament

Ten teams from the ACC were selected to the NCAA tournament, a record number from one conference.  All ten teams were also selected to host their first matches of the tournament.  Four teams received seeds, including three of the top four seeds, and first round byes.

Awards

Postseason awards 

The Atlantic Coast Conference post season awards were announced on November 13, 2019, the same day as the Semifinals of the ACC tournament.

All-ACC awards and teams

MLS SuperDraft 

Eight players from the ACC were selected in the first round of the 2020 MLS SuperDraft, which ties a record set by the ACC in 2016 and 2018.  The eight players were twice as many as any other conference had in the first round.  This is the first time the ACC has had the number one overall pick since 2016.

Total picks by school

List of selections

Notable undrafted players 
The following players went pro after the 2019 season despite not getting drafted in the 2020 MLS draft.

References

External links 
 ACC Soccer

 
2019 NCAA Division I men's soccer season